Joseph Thomas "Rock" Reed (August 7, 1912 – July 13, 2007) was an American football player who played as a halfback in the National Football League (NFL) for the Chicago Cardinals. He attended Louisiana State University, where he played college football for the LSU Tigers football team. He scored one touchdown in his professional career: a 45-yard lateral play against the Detroit Lions in Week 10 of the 1937 NFL season.

References

LSU Tigers football players
Chicago Cardinals players
1912 births
2007 deaths
American football halfbacks
Players of American football from Arkansas
People from White County, Arkansas